Nyzy (Ukrainian: Низи) is a railway station in Nyzy, Sumy Oblast, Ukraine. The station is a terminus station on the Imeni Vasylya Nesvita-Nyzy line of the Sumy Directorate of Southern Railways.

The station serves only freight trains from Imeni Vasylya Nesvita station. The movement of trains is organized by means of an electric rod system and telephone. This station provides services for the reception and delivery of goods by car and small shipments, which are loaded with whole cars. Thus loading is conducted only on access tracks and in places not public.

History

Nyzy station opened in 1905, when a  railway line was laid from Hrebinnykivka station to the Sukhanov sugar factory (currently inoperable).

Passenger service

On November 16, 2010, the movement of railcars was opened on the Hrebinnykivka (now Imeni Vasylya Nesvita) - Nyzy line. But despite the low fare of the rail bus, it was unclaimed, and was soon canceled.

Notes

 Tariff Guide No. 4. Book 1 (as of 05/15/2021) (Russian) Archived 05/15/2021.

References

External links

Nyzy station on railwayz.info

Railway stations in Sumy Oblast
Buildings and structures in Sumy Oblast